Peziza badia is a species of apothecial fungus belonging to the family Pezizaceae. This is one of the more familiar of the cup fungi of Europe, appearing as irregular dark brown cups up to 8 cm in diameter, often in small groups, on soil in woodland. The species tends to be seen more frequently on sandy soils and favours bare ground, e.g. at the sides of paths. This is a frequently observed European species with scattered records from many other parts of the world. It is edible.

References

Further reading

Pezizaceae
Edible fungi
Fungi described in 1800
Taxa named by Christiaan Hendrik Persoon